APM Automation Solutions is an Israeli-based developer of solids volume and level measurement instrumentation established in Tel Aviv, Israel. The APM technology is used in all the bulk solids industries such as: food and beverage, metals and mining, power, cement, coal, chemical, pulp and paper, and other industries. The outfit recently became part of the Emerson Process Management business under Rosemount Brand.

History
APM Automation Solutions was established in 2005 in Tel Aviv by Ofir Perl and Yossi Zlotnick. The co-founders have been involved in managing and leading large-scale development projects in telecommunications and signal processing fields for many years.

APM Automation Solutions has set a network of global distributors/agents that supply its products in over 30 countries across the US, Europe and Asia-Pacific. On December 18, 2013, APM Automation Solutions was acquired by Emerson Process Management. By this acquisition, Emerson  expands its capabilities in solids measurement applications. Emerson operates in 150 countries and has a market cap of $48.1 billion on the New York Stock Exchange with  annual sales of $24.4 billion in 2015.

APM Automation Solutions is a manufacturer of volume and level measurement instrumentation. The company offers acoustic imaging and 3D mapping technologies for the food & beverage, metals and mining, power, chemical production, cement, coal, pulp and paper industries.

See also
 Application performance management
 Emerson Electric

References

External links
 

Technology companies established in 2005
Technology companies of Israel